Biology is the scientific study of life. It is a natural science with a broad scope but has several unifying themes that tie it together as a single, coherent field. For instance, all organisms are made up of cells that process hereditary information encoded in genes, which can be transmitted to future generations. Another major theme is evolution, which explains the unity and diversity of life. Energy processing is also important to life as it allows organisms to move, grow, and reproduce. Finally, all organisms are able to regulate their own internal environments.

Biologists are able to study life at multiple levels of organization, from the molecular biology of a cell to the anatomy and physiology of plants and animals, and evolution of populations. Hence, there are multiple subdisciplines within biology, each defined by the nature of their research questions and the tools that they use. Like other scientists, biologists use the scientific method to make observations, pose questions, generate hypotheses, perform experiments, and form conclusions about the world around them.

Life on Earth, which emerged more than 3.7 billion years ago, is immensely diverse. Biologists have sought to study and classify the various forms of life, from prokaryotic organisms such as archaea and bacteria to eukaryotic organisms such as protists, fungi, plants, and animals. These various organisms contribute to the biodiversity of an ecosystem, where they play specialized roles in the cycling of nutrients and energy through their biophysical environment.

History

The earliest of roots of science, which included medicine, can be traced to ancient Egypt and Mesopotamia in around 3000 to 1200 BCE. Their contributions shaped ancient Greek natural philosophy. Ancient Greek philosophers such as Aristotle (384–322 BCE) contributed extensively to the development of biological knowledge. He explored biological causation and the diversity of life. His successor, Theophrastus, began the scientific study of plants. Scholars of the medieval Islamic world who wrote on biology included al-Jahiz (781–869), Al-Dīnawarī (828–896), who wrote on botany, and Rhazes (865–925) who wrote on anatomy and physiology. Medicine was especially well studied by Islamic scholars working in Greek philosopher traditions, while natural history drew heavily on Aristotelian thought.

Biology began to quickly develop with Anton van Leeuwenhoek's dramatic improvement of the microscope. It was then that scholars discovered spermatozoa, bacteria, infusoria and the diversity of microscopic life. Investigations by Jan Swammerdam led to new interest in entomology and helped to develop techniques of microscopic dissection and staining. Advances in microscopy had a profound impact on biological thinking. In the early 19th century, biologists pointed to the central importance of the cell. In 1838, Schleiden and Schwann began promoting the now universal ideas that (1) the basic unit of organisms is the cell and (2) that individual cells have all the characteristics of life, although they opposed the idea that (3) all cells come from the division of other cells, continuing to support spontaneous generation. However, Robert Remak and Rudolf Virchow were able to reify the third tenet, and by the 1860s most biologists accepted all three tenets which consolidated into cell theory.

Meanwhile, taxonomy and classification became the focus of natural historians. Carl Linnaeus published a basic taxonomy for the natural world in 1735, and in the 1750s introduced scientific names for all his species. Georges-Louis Leclerc, Comte de Buffon, treated species as artificial categories and living forms as malleable—even suggesting the possibility of common descent.

Serious evolutionary thinking originated with the works of Jean-Baptiste Lamarck, who presented a coherent theory of evolution. The British naturalist Charles Darwin, combining the biogeographical approach of Humboldt, the uniformitarian geology of Lyell, Malthus's writings on population growth, and his own morphological expertise and extensive natural observations, forged a more successful evolutionary theory based on natural selection; similar reasoning and evidence led Alfred Russel Wallace to independently reach the same conclusions. 

The basis for modern genetics began with the work of Gregor Mendel in 1865. This outlined the principles of biological inheritance. However, the significance of his work was not realized until the early 20th century when evolution became a unified theory as the modern synthesis reconciled Darwinian evolution with classical genetics. In the 1940s and early 1950s, a series of experiments by Alfred Hershey and Martha Chase pointed to DNA as the component of chromosomes that held the trait-carrying units that had become known as genes. A focus on new kinds of model organisms such as viruses and bacteria, along with the discovery of the double-helical structure of DNA by James Watson and Francis Crick in 1953, marked the transition to the era of molecular genetics. From the 1950s onwards, biology has been vastly extended in the molecular domain. The genetic code was cracked by Har Gobind Khorana, Robert W. Holley and Marshall Warren Nirenberg after DNA was understood to contain codons. The Human Genome Project was launched in 1990 to map the human genome.

Chemical basis

Atoms and molecules

All organisms are made up of chemical elements; oxygen, carbon, hydrogen, and nitrogen account for most (96%) of the mass of all organisms, with calcium, phosphorus, sulfur, sodium, chlorine, and magnesium constituting essentially all the remainder. Different elements can combine to form compounds such as water, which is fundamental to life. Biochemistry is the study of chemical processes within and relating to living organisms. Molecular biology is the branch of biology that seeks to understand the molecular basis of biological activity in and between cells, including molecular synthesis, modification, mechanisms, and interactions.

Water

Life arose from the Earth's first ocean, which formed some 3.8 billion years ago. Since then, water continues to be the most abundant molecule in every organism. Water is important to life because it is an effective solvent, capable of dissolving solutes such as sodium and chloride ions or other small molecules to form an aqueous solution. Once dissolved in water, these solutes are more likely to come in contact with one another and therefore take part in chemical reactions that sustain life. In terms of its molecular structure, water is a small polar molecule with a bent shape formed by the polar covalent bonds of two hydrogen (H) atoms to one oxygen (O) atom (H2O). Because the O–H bonds are polar, the oxygen atom has a slight negative charge and the two hydrogen atoms have a slight positive charge. This polar property of water allows it to attract other water molecules via hydrogen bonds, which makes water cohesive. Surface tension results from the cohesive force due to the attraction between molecules at the surface of the liquid. Water is also adhesive as it is able to adhere to the surface of any polar or charged non-water molecules. Water is denser as a liquid than it is as a solid (or ice). This unique property of water allows ice to float above liquid water such as ponds, lakes, and oceans, thereby insulating the liquid below from the cold air above. Water has the capacity to absorb energy, giving it a higher specific heat capacity than other solvents such as ethanol. Thus, a large amount of energy is needed to break the hydrogen bonds between water molecules to convert liquid water into water vapor. As a molecule, water is not completely stable as each water molecule continuously dissociates into hydrogen and hydroxyl ions before reforming into a water molecule again. In pure water, the number of hydrogen ions balances (or equals) the number of hydroxyl ions, resulting in a pH that is neutral.

Organic compounds

Organic compounds are molecules that contain carbon bonded to another element such as hydrogen. With the exception of water, nearly all the molecules that make up each organism contain carbon. Carbon can form covalent bonds with up to four other atoms, enabling it to form diverse, large, and complex molecules. For example, a single carbon atom can form four single covalent bonds such as in methane, two double covalent bonds such as in carbon dioxide, or a triple covalent bond such as in carbon monoxide (CO). Moreover, carbon can form very long chains of interconnecting carbon–carbon bonds such as octane or ring-like structures such as glucose.

The simplest form of an organic molecule is the hydrocarbon, which is a large family of organic compounds that are composed of hydrogen atoms bonded to a chain of carbon atoms. A hydrocarbon backbone can be substituted by other elements such as oxygen (O), hydrogen (H), phosphorus (P), and sulfur (S), which can change the chemical behavior of that compound. Groups of atoms that contain these elements (O-, H-, P-, and S-) and are bonded to a central carbon atom or skeleton are called functional groups. There are six prominent functional groups that can be found in organisms: amino group, carboxyl group, carbonyl group, hydroxyl group, phosphate group, and sulfhydryl group.

In 1953, the Miller-Urey experiment showed that organic compounds could be synthesized abiotically within a closed system mimicking the conditions of early Earth, thus suggesting that complex organic molecules could have arisen spontaneously in early Earth (see abiogenesis).

Macromolecules

Macromolecules are large molecules made up of smaller subunits or monomers. Monomers include  sugars, amino acids, and nucleotides. Carbohydrates include monomers and polymers of sugars. 
Lipids are the only class of macromolecules that are not made up of polymers. They include steroids, phospholipids, and fats, largely nonpolar and hydrophobic (water-repelling) substances. 
Proteins are the most diverse of the macromolecules. They include enzymes, transport proteins, large signaling molecules, antibodies, and structural proteins. The basic unit (or monomer) of a protein is an amino acid. Twenty amino acids are used in proteins. 
Nucleic acids are polymers of nucleotides. Their function is to store, transmit, and express hereditary information.

Cells

Cell theory states that cells are the fundamental units of life, that all living things are composed of one or more cells, and that all cells arise from preexisting cells through cell division. Most cells are very small, with diameters ranging from 1 to 100 micrometers and are therefore only visible under a light or electron microscope. There are generally two types of cells: eukaryotic cells, which contain a nucleus, and prokaryotic cells, which do not. Prokaryotes are single-celled organisms such as bacteria, whereas eukaryotes can be single-celled or multicellular. In multicellular organisms, every cell in the organism's body is derived ultimately from a single cell in a fertilized egg.

Cell structure

Every cell is enclosed within a cell membrane that separates its cytoplasm from the extracellular space. A cell membrane consists of a lipid bilayer, including cholesterols that sit between phospholipids to maintain their fluidity at various temperatures. Cell membranes are semipermeable, allowing small molecules such as oxygen, carbon dioxide, and water to pass through while restricting the movement of larger molecules and charged particles such as ions. Cell membranes also contains membrane proteins, including integral membrane proteins that go across the membrane serving as membrane transporters, and peripheral proteins that loosely attach to the outer side of the cell membrane, acting as enzymes shaping the cell. Cell membranes are involved in various cellular processes such as cell adhesion, storing electrical energy, and cell signalling and serve as the attachment surface for several extracellular structures such as a cell wall, glycocalyx, and cytoskeleton.

Within the cytoplasm of a cell, there are many biomolecules such as proteins and nucleic acids. In addition to biomolecules, eukaryotic cells have specialized structures called organelles that have their own lipid bilayers or are spatially units. These organelles include the cell nucleus, which contains most of the cell's DNA, or mitochondria, which generates adenosine triphosphate (ATP) to power cellular processes. Other organelles such as endoplasmic reticulum and Golgi apparatus play a role in the synthesis and packaging of proteins, respectively. Biomolecules such as proteins can be engulfed by lysosomes, another specialized organelle. Plant cells have additional organelles that distinguish them from animal cells such as a cell wall that provides support for the plant cell, chloroplasts that harvest sunlight energy to produce sugar, and vacuoles that provide storage and structural support as well as being involved in reproduction and breakdown of plant seeds. Eukaryotic cells also have cytoskeleton that is made up of microtubules, intermediate filaments, and microfilaments, all of which provide support for the cell and are involved in the movement of the cell and its organelles. In terms of their structural composition, the microtubules are made up of tubulin (e.g., α-tubulin and β-tubulin whereas intermediate filaments are made up of fibrous proteins. Microfilaments are made up of actin molecules that interact with other strands of proteins.

Metabolism

All cells require energy to sustain cellular processes. Metabolism is the set of chemical reactions in an organism. The three main purposes of metabolism are: the conversion of food to energy to run cellular processes; the conversion of food/fuel to monomer building blocks; and the elimination of metabolic wastes. These enzyme-catalyzed reactions allow organisms to grow and reproduce, maintain their structures, and respond to their environments. Metabolic reactions may be categorized as catabolic—the breaking down of compounds (for example, the breaking down of glucose to pyruvate by cellular respiration); or anabolic—the building up (synthesis) of compounds (such as proteins, carbohydrates, lipids, and nucleic acids). Usually, catabolism releases energy, and anabolism consumes energy. The chemical reactions of metabolism are organized into metabolic pathways, in which one chemical is transformed through a series of steps into another chemical, each step being facilitated by a specific enzyme. Enzymes are crucial to metabolism because they allow organisms to drive desirable reactions that require energy that will not occur by themselves, by coupling them to spontaneous reactions that release energy. Enzymes act as catalysts—they allow a reaction to proceed more rapidly without being consumed by it—by reducing the amount of activation energy needed to convert reactants into products. Enzymes also allow the regulation of the rate of a metabolic reaction, for example in response to changes in the cell's environment or to signals from other cells.

Cellular respiration

Cellular respiration is a set of metabolic reactions and processes that take place in cells to convert chemical energy from nutrients into adenosine triphosphate (ATP), and then release waste products. The reactions involved in respiration are catabolic reactions, which break large molecules into smaller ones, releasing energy. Respiration is one of the key ways a cell releases chemical energy to fuel cellular activity. The overall reaction occurs in a series of biochemical steps, some of which are redox reactions. Although cellular respiration is technically a combustion reaction, it clearly does not resemble one when it occurs in a cell because of the slow, controlled release of energy from the series of reactions.

Sugar in the form of glucose is the main nutrient used by animal and plant cells in respiration. Cellular respiration involving oxygen is called aerobic respiration, which has four stages: glycolysis, citric acid cycle (or Krebs cycle), electron transport chain, and oxidative phosphorylation. Glycolysis is a metabolic process that occurs in the cytoplasm whereby glucose is converted into two pyruvates, with two net molecules of ATP being produced at the same time. Each pyruvate is then oxidized into acetyl-CoA by the pyruvate dehydrogenase complex, which also generates NADH and carbon dioxide. Acetyl-Coa enters the citric acid cycle, which takes places inside the mitochondrial matrix. At the end of the cycle, the total yield from 1 glucose (or 2 pyruvates) is 6 NADH, 2 FADH2, and 2 ATP molecules. Finally, the next stage is oxidative phosphorylation, which in eukaryotes, occurs in the mitochondrial cristae. Oxidative phosphorylation comprises the electron transport chain, which is a series of four protein complexes that transfer electrons from one complex to another, thereby releasing energy from NADH and FADH2 that is coupled to the pumping of protons (hydrogen ions) across the inner mitochondrial membrane (chemiosmosis), which generates a proton motive force. Energy from the proton motive force drives the enzyme ATP synthase to synthesize more ATPs by phosphorylating ADPs. The transfer of electrons terminates with molecular oxygen being the final electron acceptor.

If oxygen were not present, pyruvate would not be metabolized by cellular respiration but undergoes a process of fermentation. The pyruvate is not transported into the mitochondrion but remains in the cytoplasm, where it is converted to waste products that may be removed from the cell. This serves the purpose of oxidizing the electron carriers so that they can perform glycolysis again and removing the excess pyruvate. Fermentation oxidizes NADH to NAD+ so it can be re-used in glycolysis.  In the absence of oxygen, fermentation prevents the buildup of NADH in the cytoplasm and provides NAD+ for glycolysis.  This waste product varies depending on the organism. In skeletal muscles, the waste product is lactic acid. This type of fermentation is called lactic acid fermentation. In strenuous exercise, when energy demands exceed energy supply, the respiratory chain cannot process all of the hydrogen atoms joined by NADH. During anaerobic glycolysis, NAD+ regenerates when pairs of hydrogen combine with pyruvate to form lactate. Lactate formation is catalyzed by lactate dehydrogenase in a reversible reaction. Lactate can also be used as an indirect precursor for liver glycogen. During recovery, when oxygen becomes available, NAD+ attaches to hydrogen from lactate to form ATP. In yeast, the waste products are ethanol and carbon dioxide. This type of fermentation is known as alcoholic or ethanol fermentation. The ATP generated in this process is made by substrate-level phosphorylation, which does not require oxygen.

Photosynthesis

Photosynthesis is a process used by plants and other organisms to convert light energy into chemical energy that can later be released to fuel the organism's metabolic activities via cellular respiration. This chemical energy is stored in carbohydrate molecules, such as sugars, which are synthesized from carbon dioxide and water. In most cases, oxygen is released as a waste product. Most plants, algae, and cyanobacteria perform photosynthesis, which is largely responsible for producing and maintaining the oxygen content of the Earth's atmosphere, and supplies most of the energy necessary for life on Earth.

Photosynthesis has four stages: Light absorption, electron transport, ATP synthesis, and carbon fixation. Light absorption is the initial step of photosynthesis whereby light energy is absorbed by chlorophyll pigments attached to proteins in the thylakoid membranes. The absorbed light energy is used to remove electrons from a donor (water) to a primary electron acceptor, a quinone designated as Q. In the second stage, electrons move from the quinone primary electron acceptor through a series of electron carriers until they reach a final electron acceptor, which is usually the oxidized form of NADP+, which is reduced to NADPH, a process that takes place in a protein complex called photosystem I (PSI). The transport of electrons is coupled to the movement of protons (or hydrogen) from the stroma to the thylakoid membrane, which forms a pH gradient across the membrane as hydrogen becomes more concentrated in the lumen than in the stroma. This is analogous to the proton-motive force generated across the inner mitochondrial membrane in aerobic respiration.

During the third stage of photosynthesis, the movement of protons down their concentration gradients from the thylakoid lumen to the stroma through the ATP synthase is coupled to the synthesis of ATP by that same ATP synthase. The NADPH and ATPs generated by the light-dependent reactions in the second and third stages, respectively, provide the energy and electrons to drive the synthesis of glucose by fixing atmospheric carbon dioxide into existing organic carbon compounds, such as ribulose bisphosphate (RuBP) in a sequence of light-independent (or dark) reactions called the Calvin cycle.

Cell signaling

Cell signaling (or communication) is the ability of cells to receive, process, and transmit signals with its environment and with itself. Signals can be non-chemical such as light, electrical impulses, and heat, or chemical signals (or ligands) that interact with receptors, which can be found embedded in the cell membrane of another cell or located deep inside a cell. There are generally four types of chemical signals: autocrine, paracrine, juxtacrine, and hormones. In autocrine signaling, the ligand affects the same cell that releases it. Tumor cells, for example, can reproduce uncontrollably because they release signals that initiate their own self-division. In paracrine signaling, the ligand diffuses to nearby cells and affects them. For example, brain cells called neurons release ligands called neurotransmitters that diffuse across a synaptic cleft to bind with a receptor on an adjacent cell such as another neuron or muscle cell. In juxtacrine signaling, there is direct contact between the signaling and responding cells. Finally, hormones are ligands that travel through the circulatory systems of animals or vascular systems of plants to reach their target cells. Once a ligand binds with a receptor, it can influence the behavior of another cell, depending on the type of receptor. For instance, neurotransmitters that bind with an inotropic receptor can alter the excitability of a target cell. Other types of receptors include protein kinase receptors (e.g., receptor for the hormone insulin) and G protein-coupled receptors. Activation of G protein-coupled receptors can initiate second messenger cascades. The process by which a chemical or physical signal is transmitted through a cell as a series of molecular events is called signal transduction

Cell cycle

The cell cycle is a series of events that take place in a cell that cause it to divide into two daughter cells. These events include the duplication of its DNA and some of its organelles, and the subsequent partitioning of its cytoplasm into two daughter cells in a process called cell division. In eukaryotes (i.e., animal, plant, fungal, and protist cells), there are two distinct types of cell division: mitosis and meiosis. Mitosis is part of the cell cycle, in which replicated chromosomes are separated into two new nuclei. Cell division gives rise to genetically identical cells in which the total number of chromosomes is maintained. In general, mitosis (division of the nucleus) is preceded by the S stage of interphase (during which the DNA is replicated) and is often followed by telophase and cytokinesis; which divides the cytoplasm, organelles and cell membrane of one cell into two new cells containing roughly equal shares of these cellular components. The different stages of mitosis all together define the mitotic phase of an animal cell cycle—the division of the mother cell into two genetically identical daughter cells. The cell cycle is a vital process by which a single-celled fertilized egg develops into a mature organism, as well as the process by which hair, skin, blood cells, and some internal organs are renewed. After cell division, each of the daughter cells begin the interphase of a new cycle. In contrast to mitosis, meiosis results in four haploid daughter cells by undergoing one round of DNA replication followed by two divisions. Homologous chromosomes are separated in the first division (meiosis I), and sister chromatids are separated in the second division (meiosis II). Both of these cell division cycles are used in the process of sexual reproduction at some point in their life cycle. Both are believed to be present in the last eukaryotic common ancestor.

Prokaryotes (i.e., archaea and bacteria) can also undergo cell division (or binary fission). Unlike the processes of mitosis and meiosis in eukaryotes, binary fission takes in prokaryotes takes place without the formation of a spindle apparatus on the cell. Before binary fission, DNA in the bacterium is tightly coiled. After it has uncoiled and duplicated, it is pulled to the separate poles of the bacterium as it increases the size to prepare for splitting. Growth of a new cell wall begins to separate the bacterium (triggered by FtsZ polymerization and "Z-ring" formation) The new cell wall (septum) fully develops, resulting in the complete split of the bacterium. The new daughter cells have tightly coiled DNA rods, ribosomes, and plasmids.

Genetics

Inheritance

Genetics is the scientific study of inheritance. Mendelian inheritance, specifically, is the process by which genes and traits are passed on from parents to offspring. It has several principles. The first is that genetic characteristics, alleles, are discrete and have alternate forms (e.g., purple vs. white or tall vs. dwarf), each inherited from one of two parents. Based on the law of dominance and uniformity, which states that some alleles are dominant while others are recessive; an organism with at least one dominant allele will display the phenotype of that dominant allele. During gamete formation, the alleles for each gene segregate, so that each gamete carries only one allele for each gene. Heterozygotic individuals produce gametes with an equal frequency of two alleles. Finally, the law of independent assortment, states that genes of different traits can segregate independently during the formation of gametes, i.e., genes are unlinked. An exception to this rule would include traits that are sex-linked. Test crosses can be performed to experimentally determine the underlying genotype of an organism with a dominant phenotype. A Punnett square can be used to predict the results of a test cross. The chromosome theory of inheritance, which states that genes are found on chromosomes, was supported by Thomas Morgans's experiments with fruit flies, which established the sex linkage between eye color and sex in these insects.

Genes and DNA

A gene is a unit of heredity that corresponds to a region of deoxyribonucleic acid (DNA) that carries genetic information that controls form or function of an organism. DNA is composed of two polynucleotide chains that coil around each other to form a double helix. It is found as linear chromosomes in eukaryotes, and circular chromosomes in prokaryotes. The set of chromosomes in a cell is collectively known as its genome. In eukaryotes, DNA is mainly in the cell nucleus. In prokaryotes, the DNA is held within the nucleoid. The genetic information is held within genes, and the complete assemblage in an organism is called its genotype. 
DNA replication is a semiconservative process whereby each strand serves as a template for a new strand of DNA. Mutations are heritable changes in DNA. They can arise spontaneously as a result of replication errors that were not corrected by proofreading or can be induced by an environmental mutagen such as a chemical (e.g., nitrous acid, benzopyrene) or radiation (e.g., x-ray, gamma ray, ultraviolet radiation, particles emitted by unstable isotopes). Mutations can lead to phenotypic effects such as loss-of-function, gain-of-function, and conditional mutations.
Some mutations are beneficial, as they are a source of genetic variation for evolution. Others are harmful if they were to result in a loss of function of genes needed for survival. Mutagens such as carcinogens are typically avoided as a matter of public health policy goals.

Gene expression

Gene expression is the molecular process by which a genotype encoded in DNA gives rise to an observable phenotype in the proteins of an organism's body. This process is summarized by the central dogma of molecular biology, which was formulated by Francis Crick in 1958. According to the Central Dogma, genetic information flows from DNA to RNA to protein. There are two gene expression processes: transcription (DNA to RNA) and translation (RNA to protein).

Gene regulation

The regulation of gene expression by environmental factors and during different stages of development can occur at each step of the process such as transcription, RNA splicing, translation, and post-translational modification of a protein. Gene expression can be influenced by positive or negative regulation, depending on which of the two types of regulatory proteins called transcription factors bind to the DNA sequence close to or at a promoter. A cluster of genes that share the same promoter is called an operon, found mainly in prokaryotes and some lower eukaryotes (e.g., Caenorhabditis elegans). In positive regulation of gene expression, the activator is the transcription factor that stimulates transcription when it binds to the sequence near or at the promoter. Negative regulation occurs when another transcription factor called a repressor binds to a DNA sequence called an operator, which is part of an operon, to prevent transcription. Repressors can be inhibited by compounds called inducers (e.g., allolactose), thereby allowing transcription to occur. Specific genes that can be activated by inducers are called inducible genes, in contrast to constitutive genes that are almost constantly active. In contrast to both, structural genes encode proteins that are not involved in gene regulation. In addition to regulatory events involving the promoter, gene expression can also be regulated by epigenetic changes to chromatin, which is a complex of DNA and protein found in eukaryotic cells.

Genes, development, and evolution

Development is the process by which a multicellular organism (plant or animal) goes through a series of changes, starting from a single cell, and taking on various forms that are characteristic of its life cycle. There are four key processes that underlie development: Determination, differentiation, morphogenesis, and growth. Determination sets the developmental fate of a cell, which becomes more restrictive during development. Differentiation is the process by which specialized cells from less specialized cells such as stem cells. Stem cells are undifferentiated or partially differentiated cells that can differentiate into various types of cells and proliferate indefinitely to produce more of the same stem cell. Cellular differentiation dramatically changes a cell's size, shape, membrane potential, metabolic activity, and responsiveness to signals, which are largely due to highly controlled modifications in gene expression and epigenetics.  With a few exceptions, cellular differentiation almost never involves a change in the DNA sequence itself. Thus, different cells can have very different physical characteristics despite having the same genome. Morphogenesis, or the development of body form, is the result of spatial differences in gene expression. A small fraction of the genes in an organism's genome called the developmental-genetic toolkit control the development of that organism. These toolkit genes are highly conserved among phyla, meaning that they are ancient and very similar in widely separated groups of animals. Differences in deployment of toolkit genes affect the body plan and the number, identity, and pattern of body parts. Among the most important toolkit genes are the Hox genes. Hox genes determine where repeating parts, such as the many vertebrae of snakes, will grow in a developing embryo or larva.

Evolution

Evolutionary processes

Evolution is a central organizing concept in biology. It is the change in heritable characteristics of populations over successive generations. In artificial selection, animals were selectively bred for specific traits.
 Given that traits are inherited, populations contain a varied mix of traits, and reproduction is able to increase any population, Darwin argued that in the natural world, it was nature that played the role of humans in selecting for specific traits. Darwin inferred that individuals who possessed heritable traits better adapted to their environments are more likely to survive and produce more offspring than other individuals. He further inferred that this would lead to the accumulation of favorable traits over successive generations, thereby increasing the match between the organisms and their environment.

Speciation

A species is a group of organisms that mate with one another and speciation is the process by which one lineage splits into two lineages as a result of having evolved independently from each other. For speciation to occur, there has to be reproductive isolation. Reproductive isolation can result from incompatibilities between genes as described by Bateson–Dobzhansky–Muller model. Reproductive isolation also tends to increase with genetic divergence. Speciation can occur when there are physical barriers that divide an ancestral species, a process known as allopatric speciation.

Phylogeny

A phylogeny is an evolutionary history of a specific group of organisms or their genes. It can be represented using a phylogenetic tree, a diagram showing lines of descent among organisms or their genes. Each line drawn on the time axis of a tree represents a lineage of descendants of a particular species or population. When a lineage divides into two, it is represented as a fork or split on the phylogenetic tree. Phylogenetic trees are the basis for comparing and grouping different species. Different species that share a feature inherited from a common ancestor are described as having homologous features (or synapomorphy). Phylogeny provides the basis of biological classification. This classification system is rank-based, with the highest rank being the domain followed by kingdom, phylum, class, order, family, genus, and species. All organisms can be classified as belonging to one of three domains: Archaea (originally Archaebacteria); bacteria (originally eubacteria), or eukarya (includes the protist, fungi, plant, and animal kingdoms).

History of life

The history of life on Earth traces how organisms have evolved from the earliest emergence of life to present day. Earth formed about 4.5 billion years ago and all life on Earth, both living and extinct, descended from a last universal common ancestor that lived about 3.5 billion years ago. Geologists have developed a geologic time scale that divides the history of the Earth into major divisions, starting with four eons (Hadean, Archean, Proterozoic, and Phanerozoic), the first three of which are collectively known as the Precambrian, which lasted approximately 4 billion years. Each eon can be divided into eras, with the Phanerozoic eon that began 539 million years ago being subdivided into Paleozoic, Mesozoic, and Cenozoic eras. These three eras together comprise eleven periods (Cambrian, Ordovician, Silurian, Devonian, Carboniferous, Permian, Triassic, Jurassic, Cretaceous, Tertiary, and Quaternary).

The similarities among all known present-day species indicate that they have diverged through the process of evolution from their common ancestor. Biologists regard the ubiquity of the genetic code as evidence of universal common descent for all bacteria, archaea, and eukaryotes. Microbal mats of coexisting bacteria and archaea were the dominant form of life in the early Archean epoch and many of the major steps in early evolution are thought to have taken place in this environment. The earliest evidence of eukaryotes dates from 1.85 billion years ago, and while they may have been present earlier, their diversification accelerated when they started using oxygen in their metabolism. Later, around 1.7 billion years ago, multicellular organisms began to appear, with differentiated cells performing specialised functions.

Algae-like multicellular land plants are dated back even to about 1 billion years ago, although evidence suggests that microorganisms formed the earliest terrestrial ecosystems, at least 2.7 billion years ago. Microorganisms are thought to have paved the way for the inception of land plants in the Ordovician period. Land plants were so successful that they are thought to have contributed to the Late Devonian extinction event.

Ediacara biota appear during the Ediacaran period, while vertebrates, along with most other modern phyla originated about 525 million years ago during the Cambrian explosion. During the Permian period, synapsids, including the ancestors of mammals, dominated the land, but most of this group became extinct in the Permian–Triassic extinction event 252 million years ago. During the recovery from this catastrophe, archosaurs became the most abundant land vertebrates; one archosaur group, the dinosaurs, dominated the Jurassic and Cretaceous periods. After the Cretaceous–Paleogene extinction event 66 million years ago killed off the non-avian dinosaurs, mammals increased rapidly in size and diversity. Such mass extinctions may have accelerated evolution by providing opportunities for new groups of organisms to diversify.

Diversity

Bacteria and Archaea

Bacteria are a type of cell that constitute a large domain of prokaryotic microorganisms. Typically a few micrometers in length, bacteria have a number of shapes, ranging from spheres to rods and spirals. Bacteria were among the first life forms to appear on Earth, and are present in most of its habitats. Bacteria inhabit soil, water, acidic hot springs, radioactive waste, and the deep biosphere of the earth's crust. Bacteria also live in symbiotic and parasitic relationships with plants and animals. Most bacteria have not been characterised, and only about 27 percent of the bacterial phyla have species that can be grown in the laboratory.

Archaea constitute the other domain of prokaryotic cells and were initially classified as bacteria, receiving the name archaebacteria (in the Archaebacteria kingdom), a term that has fallen out of use. Archaeal cells have unique properties separating them from the other two domains, Bacteria and Eukaryota. Archaea are further divided into multiple recognized phyla. Archaea and bacteria are generally similar in size and shape, although a few archaea have very different shapes, such as the flat and square cells of Haloquadratum walsbyi. Despite this morphological similarity to bacteria, archaea possess genes and several metabolic pathways that are more closely related to those of eukaryotes, notably for the enzymes involved in transcription and translation. Other aspects of archaeal biochemistry are unique, such as their reliance on ether lipids in their cell membranes, including archaeols. Archaea use more energy sources than eukaryotes: these range from organic compounds, such as sugars, to ammonia, metal ions or even hydrogen gas. Salt-tolerant archaea (the Haloarchaea) use sunlight as an energy source, and other species of archaea fix carbon, but unlike plants and cyanobacteria, no known species of archaea does both. Archaea reproduce asexually by binary fission, fragmentation, or budding; unlike bacteria, no known species of Archaea form endospores.

The first observed archaea were extremophiles, living in extreme environments, such as hot springs and salt lakes with no other organisms. Improved molecular detection tools led to the discovery of archaea in almost every habitat, including soil, oceans, and marshlands. Archaea are particularly numerous in the oceans, and the archaea in plankton may be one of the most abundant groups of organisms on the planet.

Archaea are a major part of Earth's life. They are part of the microbiota of all organisms. In the human microbiome, they are important in the gut, mouth, and on the skin. Their morphological, metabolic, and geographical diversity permits them to play multiple ecological roles: carbon fixation; nitrogen cycling; organic compound turnover; and maintaining microbial symbiotic and syntrophic communities, for example.

Eukaryotes

Eukaryotes are hypothesized to have split from archaea, which was followed by their endosymbioses with bacteria (or symbiogenesis) that gave rise to mitochondria and chloroplasts, both of which are now part of modern-day eukaryotic cells. The major lineages of eukaryotes diversified in the Precambrian about 1.5 billion years ago and can be classified into eight major clades: alveolates, excavates, stramenopiles, plants, rhizarians, amoebozoans, fungi, and animals. Five of these clades are collectively known as protists, which are mostly microscopic eukaryotic organisms that are not plants, fungi, or animals. While it is likely that protists share a common ancestor (the last eukaryotic common ancestor), protists by themselves do not constitute a separate clade as some protists may be more closely related to plants, fungi, or animals than they are to other protists. Like groupings such as algae, invertebrates, or protozoans, the protist grouping is not a formal taxonomic group but is used for convenience. Most protists are unicellular; these are called microbial eukaryotes.

Plants are mainly multicellular organisms, predominantly photosynthetic eukaryotes of the kingdom Plantae, which would exclude fungi and some algae. Plant cells were derived by endosymbiosis of a cyanobacterium into an early eukaryote about one billion years ago, which gave rise to chloroplasts. The first several clades that emerged following primary endosymbiosis were aquatic and most of the aquatic photosynthetic eukaryotic organisms are collectively described as algae, which is a term of convenience as not all algae are closely related. Algae comprise several distinct clades such as glaucophytes, which are microscopic freshwater algae that may have resembled in form to the early unicellular ancestor of Plantae. Unlike glaucophytes, the other algal clades such as red and green algae are multicellular. Green algae comprise three major clades: chlorophytes, coleochaetophytes, and stoneworts.

Fungi are eukaryotes that digest foods outside their bodies, secreting digestive enzymes that break down large food molecules before absorbing them through their cell membranes. Many fungi are also saprobes, feeding on dead organic matter, making them important decomposers in ecological systems. 

Animals are multicellular eukaryotes. With few exceptions, animals consume organic material, breathe oxygen, are able to move, can reproduce sexually, and grow from a hollow sphere of cells, the blastula, during embryonic development. Over 1.5 million living animal species have been described—of which around 1 million are insects—but it has been estimated there are over 7 million animal species in total. They have complex interactions with each other and their environments, forming intricate food webs.

Viruses

Viruses are submicroscopic infectious agents that replicate inside the cells of organisms. Viruses infect all types of life forms, from animals and plants to microorganisms, including bacteria and archaea. More than 6,000 virus species have been described in detail. Viruses are found in almost every ecosystem on Earth and are the most numerous type of biological entity.

The origins of viruses in the evolutionary history of life are unclear: some may have evolved from plasmids—pieces of DNA that can move between cells—while others may have evolved from bacteria. In evolution, viruses are an important means of horizontal gene transfer, which increases genetic diversity in a way analogous to sexual reproduction. Because viruses possess some but not all characteristics of life, they have been described as "organisms at the edge of life", and as self-replicators.

Ecology

Ecology is the study of the distribution and abundance of life, the interaction between organisms and their environment.

Ecosystems

The community of living (biotic) organisms in conjunction with the nonliving (abiotic) components (e.g., water, light, radiation, temperature, humidity, atmosphere, acidity, and soil) of their environment is called an ecosystem. These biotic and abiotic components are linked together through nutrient cycles and energy flows. Energy from the sun enters the system through photosynthesis and is incorporated into plant tissue. By feeding on plants and on one another, animals move matter and energy through the system. They also influence the quantity of plant and microbial biomass present. By breaking down dead organic matter, decomposers release carbon back to the atmosphere and facilitate nutrient cycling by converting nutrients stored in dead biomass back to a form that can be readily used by plants and other microbes.

Populations

A population is the group of organisms of the same species that occupies an area and reproduce from generation to generation. Population size can be estimated by multiplying population density by the area or volume. The carrying capacity of an environment is the maximum population size of a species that can be sustained by that specific environment, given the food, habitat, water, and other resources that are available. The carrying capacity of a population can be affected by changing environmental conditions such as changes in the availability resources and the cost of maintaining them. In human populations, new technologies such as the Green revolution have helped increase the Earth's carrying capacity for humans over time, which has stymied the attempted predictions of impending population decline, the most famous of which was by Thomas Malthus in the 18th century.

Communities

A community is a group of populations of species occupying the same geographical area at the same time. A biological interaction is the effect that a pair of organisms living together in a community have on each other. They can be either of the same species (intraspecific interactions), or of different species (interspecific interactions). These effects may be short-term, like pollination and predation, or long-term; both often strongly influence the evolution of the species involved. A long-term interaction is called a symbiosis. Symbioses range from mutualism, beneficial to both partners, to competition, harmful to both partners. Every species participates as a consumer, resource, or both in consumer–resource interactions, which form the core of food chains or food webs. There are different trophic levels within any food web, with the lowest level being the primary producers (or autotrophs) such as plants and algae that convert energy and inorganic material into organic compounds, which can then be used by the rest of the community. At the next level are the heterotrophs, which are the species that obtain energy by breaking apart organic compounds from other organisms. Heterotrophs that consume plants are primary consumers (or herbivores) whereas heterotrophs that consume herbivores are secondary consumers (or carnivores). And those that eat secondary consumers are tertiary consumers and so on. Omnivorous heterotrophs are able to consume at multiple levels. Finally, there are decomposers that feed on the waste products or dead bodies of organisms.
On average, the total amount of energy incorporated into the biomass of a trophic level per unit of time is about one-tenth of the energy of the trophic level that it consumes. Waste and dead material used by decomposers as well as heat lost from metabolism make up the other ninety percent of energy that is not consumed by the next trophic level.

Biosphere

In the global ecosystem or biosphere, matter exists as different interacting compartments, which can be biotic or abiotic as well as accessible or inaccessible, depending on their forms and locations. For example, matter from terrestrial autotrophs are both biotic and accessible to other organisms whereas the matter in rocks and minerals are abiotic and inaccessible. A biogeochemical cycle is a pathway by which specific elements of matter are turned over or moved through the biotic (biosphere) and the abiotic (lithosphere, atmosphere, and hydrosphere) compartments of Earth. There are biogeochemical cycles for nitrogen, carbon, and water.

Conservation

Conservation biology is the study of the conservation of Earth's biodiversity with the aim of protecting species, their habitats, and ecosystems from excessive rates of extinction and the erosion of biotic interactions. It is concerned with factors that influence the maintenance, loss, and restoration of biodiversity and the science of sustaining evolutionary processes that engender genetic, population, species, and ecosystem diversity. The concern stems from estimates suggesting that up to 50% of all species on the planet will disappear within the next 50 years, which has contributed to poverty, starvation, and will reset the course of evolution on this planet. Biodiversity affects the functioning of ecosystems, which provide a variety of services upon which people depend. Conservation biologists research and educate on the trends of biodiversity loss, species extinctions, and the negative effect these are having on our capabilities to sustain the well-being of human society. Organizations and citizens are responding to the current biodiversity crisis through conservation action plans that direct research, monitoring, and education programs that engage concerns at local through global scales.

See also 

 Biology in fiction
 Glossary of biology
 List of biological websites
 List of biologists
 List of biology journals
 List of biology topics
 List of life sciences
 List of omics topics in biology
 National Association of Biology Teachers
 Outline of biology
 Periodic table of life sciences in Tinbergen's four questions
 Reproduction
 Science tourism
 Terminology of biology

References

Further reading

External links 

 
 OSU's Phylocode
 Biology Online – Wiki Dictionary
 MIT video lecture series on biology
 OneZoom Tree of Life

Journal links
 PLOS Biology A peer-reviewed, open-access journal published by the Public Library of Science
 Current Biology: General journal publishing original research from all areas of biology
 Biology Letters: A high-impact Royal Society journal publishing peer-reviewed biology papers of general interest
 Science: Internationally renowned AAAS science journal – see sections of the life sciences
 International Journal of Biological Sciences: A biological journal publishing significant peer-reviewed scientific papers
 Perspectives in Biology and Medicine: An interdisciplinary scholarly journal publishing essays of broad relevance

Biology
Biology terminology